Step Lively is a 1917 American short comedy film featuring Harold Lloyd. A print of the film at the UCLA Film and Television Archive. Like many American films of the time, Step Lively was subject to cuts by city and state film censorship boards. For example, the Chicago Board of Censors required two views of a quarter to be cut.

Cast

 Harold Lloyd 
 Snub Pollard 
 Bebe Daniels 
 W.L. Adams
 William Blaisdell
 Sammy Brooks
 Lige Conley (credited as Lige Cromley)
 Billy Fay
 William Gillespie
 Bud Jamison
 Gus Leonard
 Fred C. Newmeyer
 Charles Stevenson (credited as Charles E. Stevenson)

See also
 Harold Lloyd filmography

References

External links

1917 films
1917 comedy films
American silent short films
American black-and-white films
Films directed by Alfred J. Goulding
1917 short films
Silent American comedy films
American comedy short films
Censored films
1910s American films